19 Canum Venaticorum is a binary star system in the northern constellation of Canes Venatici, located approximately 238 light years from Sun based on its parallax. It is dimly visible to the naked eye as a white-hued star with an apparent visual magnitude of 5.77. The pair orbit each other with a period of 219.2 years and an eccentricity of 0.686. The system is moving closer to the Earth with a heliocentric radial velocity of −21 km/s.

The magnitude +5.87 primary, component A, is an A-type main-sequence star with a stellar classification of A7 V. It is 366 million years old with twice the mass of the Sun and 2.5 times the Sun's radius. The star is radiating 25.5 times the Sun's luminosity from its photosphere at an effective temperature of 8,048 K. It has a high rate of spin, showing a projected rotational velocity of 110 km/s.

References

A-type main-sequence stars
Binary stars
Canes Venatici
Durchmusterung objects
Canum Venaticorum, 19
115271
064692
5004